The Historic Hotels of Europe (HHE) is an umbrella organisation established to promote like-minded independent hotel associations throughout Europe. Castles, manors, convents, palaces, monasteries, townhouses, villas and residences which have maintained their historic character are part of the HHE.

History
The original concept for forming a Federation with associations representing historic hotels, castles, manors, and restaurants within Europe was initiated by the "Châteaux & Hôtels de France" (today Châteaux & Hôtels Collection) of France and the "Schlosshotels & Herrenhäuser" of Austria. The idea was to promote national cultural traditions, historic heritage, and architecture under one umbrella organisation. The Federation to advocate a more "cultural and historic" style of holiday was established in November 1997, initially consisting of eight associations in different countries.

The first formal meeting of the "European Federation of Traditional Accommodation and Historic Houses" was held in Cadiz, Spain and hosted by the "Estancias de España" in 1998. Since this first general meeting, General Assemblies are held twice a year, and the board of directors meet whenever it is necessary for the development of the Federation. The meetings take place all over Europe, and are always hosted by one of the members associations.

The Federation was renamed Historic Hotels of Europe in 2003. By 2016, its membership had been extended to include 13 associations in 18 countries. The HHE with its network encompasses almost 500 properties.

Member organisations

See also
List of Historic Hotels of America
European Network for Accessible Tourism
National Trust for Historic Preservation

References

External links

Hotel affiliation groups
Business organizations based in Europe
1997 establishments in Europe